The men's 100 metre butterfly event at the 1972 Olympic Games took place between August 30 and 31. This swimming event used the butterfly stroke. Because an Olympic size swimming pool is 50 metres long, this race consisted of two lengths of the pool.

Medalists

Results

Heats

Heat 1

Key: Q = Qualified

Heat 2

Key: Q = Qualified

Heat 3

Key: Q = Qualified

Heat 4

Key: Q = Qualified

Heat 5

Key: Q = Qualified

Semifinals
Heat 1

Heat 2

Final

Key: WR = World record

References

Men's butterfly 100 metre
Men's 100 metre butterfly
Men's events at the 1972 Summer Olympics